Seydou Badjan Kanté (born 7 August 1981) is a former Ivorian footballer  who played as a defender.

Club career
Kanté is a product of the famed youth academy at Ivorian-based club ASEC Mimosas. He joined Belgian side KSK Beveren in 2004, spending three years there. Then, he moved to French club FC Istres, which he left after one year.

International career
He was called up to the Ivory Coast national team for the 2008 African Cup of Nations qualifier against Gabon on 5 October 2006.

References

External links
 
 

1981 births
Living people
Association football defenders
Ivorian footballers
Ivorian expatriate footballers
Ivory Coast international footballers
2002 African Cup of Nations players
Belgian Pro League players
ASEC Mimosas players
K.S.K. Beveren players
FC Istres players
Expatriate footballers in Belgium
Expatriate footballers in France